The George Jean Nathan Award for Dramatic Criticism is administered by the Cornell University Department of English and presented "to the American who has written the best piece of drama criticism during the theatrical year (July 1 to June 30), whether it is an article, an essay, treatise or book." The prize was established by the prominent drama critic, George Jean Nathan, who instructed in his will that the net income of half of his estate be awarded to the recipient of the award. Today, the award amounts to about $10,000. Winners are selected annually by a committee composed of the heads of the English departments at Cornell University, Princeton University, and Yale University. Drama specialists from each university now also contribute to the selection process. The first prize was awarded following the 1958–1959 theatrical year.

Recipients

Recipients of the George Jean Nathan Award are as follows:

2020–2021: Maya Phillips
2019–2020: Alexis Soloski
2018–2019: Soraya Nadia McDonald
2017–2018: John H. Muse and Helen Shaw
2016–2017: Sara Holdren
2015–2016: Shonni Enelow
2014–2015: Brian Eugenio Herrera and Chris Jones
2013–2014: Michael Feingold
2012–2013: Scott Brown
2011–2012: Kenneth Gross and Jonathan Kalb
2010–2011: Jill Dolan
2009–2010: Charles McNulty
2008–2009: Marc Robinson
2007–2008: Randy Gener
2006–2007: H. Scott McMillin
2005–2006: Charles Isherwood
2004–2005: Raymond Knapp
2003–2004: Trey Graham
2002–2003: Hilton Als
2001–2002: Daniel Mendelsohn
2000–2001: Laurence Senelick
1999–2000: Albert Williams
1998–1999: Michael Goldman
1997–1998: Alisa Solomon
1996–1997: Ben Brantley, Elinor Fuchs, and Todd London
1995–1996: Michael Feingold
1994–1995: Robert Hurwitt
1993–1994: Marvin Carlson and John Lahr
1992–1993: David Cole
1991–1992: Kevin Kelly
1990–1991: Jonathan Kalb
1989–1990: Steven Mikulan
1988–1989: Eileen Blumenthal
1987–1988: Scott Rosenberg
1986–1987: Robert Brustein
1985–1986: Gordon Rogoff
1984–1985: Jan Kott
1983–1984: Bonnie Marranca
1982–1983: Herbert Blau
1981–1982: Julius Novick
1980–1981: Carolyn Clay and Sylviane Gold
1979–1980: Sean Mitchell
1978–1979: Jack Kroll
1977–1978: Mel Gussow
1976–1977: Bernard Knox
1975–1976: Michael Goldman
1974–1975: No Award Given
1973–1974: Albert Bermel
1972–1973: Stanley Kauffmann
1971–1972: Jay Carr
1970–1971: Richard Gilman
1969–1970: John Simon
1968–1969: John Lahr
1967–1968: Martin Gottfried
1966–1967: Elizabeth Hardwick
1965–1966: Eric Russell Bentley
1964–1965: Gerald Weales
1963–1964: Elliot Norton
1962–1963: Walter Kerr
1961–1962: Robert Brustein
1960–1961: Jerry Tallmer
1959–1960: C.L. Barber
1958-1958: Harold Clurman

See also
 Theatre criticism

References 

Theatre criticism
Awards established in 1959